Agylla involuta is a moth of the family Erebidae. It was described by George Hampson in 1900. It is found in Rio de Janeiro, Brazil.

References

Moths described in 1900
involuta
Moths of South America